The Purple Cipher is a 1920 American silent mystery film directed by Chester Bennett and starring Earle Williams, Vola Vale and Ernest Shields. Shot by Vitagraph at the company's Brooklyn studios, it was based on the short story The Purple Hieroglyph by Murray Leinster. The story was adapted twice more in the sound era as Murder Will Out (1930) and Torchy Blane in Chinatown  (1939).

Cast
 Earle Williams as Leonard Staunton
 Vola Vale as Jeanne Baldwin
 Ernest Shields as 	Jack Baldwin
 Allan Forrest as 	Alan Fitzhugh
 Henry A. Barrows as Frank Condon
 Goro Kino as 	Hop Lee
 Frank M. Seki as Wong Foo

References

Bibliography
 Billee J. Stallings & Jo-an J. Evans. Murray Leinster: The Life and Works. McFarland, 2011.

External links
 

1920 films
1920 mystery films
American silent feature films
American mystery films
American black-and-white films
Films directed by Chester Bennett
Vitagraph Studios films
1920s English-language films
1920s American films
Silent mystery films